Founded in 2004 by producer Ben Neidle, Noise Fusion is an audio production company based in London, UK, that creates audio branding for radio and television.

Information
Noise Fusion has been recognised for their audio imaging work for the UK radio station XFM - some of this work was nominated for a 2006 Sony Radio Academy Award. The company's creative director, Ben Neidle, previously received three Sony Radio Academy Awards while employed by XFM from 1998-2004 as a producer.

As of 2016, the company's main activities appear to be custom music production for media and sound design services. They also offer radio imaging effects packages for producers and stations to purchase.

In 2017 Noise Fusion produced the music for the Channel 5 programme Access.

References

External links
 Noise Fusion

Audio branding